18F-Fluorocholine is an oncologic PET tracer.

References 

PET radiotracers
Quaternary ammonium compounds